Thrinax excelsa, commonly known as broad thatch, is a species of palm which is endemic to Jamaica.

Description
Plants have between 6 and 17 palmately compound leaves with 52 to 65 leaflets. The inflorescences are arched and are not longer than the leaves. The bisexual flowers are small. The fruit are small, single-seeded, globose and white when mature.

Distribution

References

excelsa
Endemic flora of Jamaica
Trees of Jamaica
Plants described in 1853